Alexandria Senior High School is a public secondary school located in Alexandria, Louisiana, United States. The school serves about 1,300 students in grades 9 to 12 in the Rapides Parish School Board district.

Alexandria Senior High (commonly referred to as "ASH") first opened in fall 1969. A few months before it opened, a makeshift student council was elected by the local junior and senior high school students that would be joining to create ASH's student body. This advisory board acted as a Student Council until one could be elected. During its first meeting, the council selected the school colors of purple and gold. The Council went on to choose its mascot, the Trojan. In the 2010–2011 school year, Alexandria Senior High was the second largest school in Rapides Parish.

Athletics
The high schools sports teams, the ASH Trojans, are members of LHSAA. ASH compete's in the LHSAA's top classification, Class 5A, starting in August 2013. The Trojans competed in the second highest classification, 4A, from 1991 to 1992 through 2012–13, when the school was reclassified into 5A, the highest classification. ASH is currently a member of District 2-5A with Rapides Parish rival Pineville, along with Natchitoches Central, Ouachita, Ruston, West Monroe and West Ouachita.

Sports offered:
American football, swimming (boys and girls), golf, cross country, soccer (boys and girls), powerlifting (boys and girls), basketball (boys and girls), tennis (boys and girls), baseball, softball, boys' and grils' track and field (outdoor and indoor), cheerleading, band (Drumline), archery and danceline.

Alexandria Senior High School principals
Since 1969, ASH has had nine principals:

R. Raymond Bamburg - 1969-1983
Aubrey Sanders - 1983–1990, 1991–1994
Lyle Hutchinson - 1990–1991, 1994–1998
Rita Guinn - 1998 - 2000
Joe Moreau - 2001 - 2007
Billy Albritton - 2007–2010
Duane Urbina - 2010–2017
Jonathan Garret - 2017–2019
Jody Goodman- 2019–present

Notable alumni

Chris Boniol (Class of 1990), American football placekicker
DJ Chark (Class of 2014), American football wide receiver
Demar Dotson (Class of 2004), American football player
Nic Harris (Class of 2005), American football linebacker
Craig Nall (Class of 1997), American football quarterback 
Juan Pierre (Class of 1995), professional baseball player
Lamar White Jr. (Class of 2000), blogger and political activist
Rachel Ball (Class of 2019), vlogger

References

External links
Alexandria Senior High School website

ASH American football website

Buildings and structures in Alexandria, Louisiana
Educational institutions established in 1969
Public high schools in Louisiana
Schools in Rapides Parish, Louisiana
1969 establishments in Louisiana